The 1892 United States presidential election in Washington took place on November 8, 1892, as part of the 1892 United States presidential election. Voters chose four representatives, or electors to the Electoral College, who voted for president and vice president.

Washington participated in its first ever presidential election, having become the 42nd state on November 11, 1889. The state voted for the Republican incumbent president, Benjamin Harrison, over the Democratic candidate and former president, Grover Cleveland by a margin of 6,658 votes, or a 7.57% margin.

Results

Results by county

See also
 United States presidential elections in Washington (state)

References

Washington (state)
1892
1892 Washington (state) elections